Kenneth Cobonpue (born December 16, 1968) is a Filipino industrial designer known for his unique designs integrating natural materials through innovative handmade production processes.  He began his design career after his studies in Industrial Design in New York, which led him to apprenticeships and further studies in Italy and Germany.

Cobonpue pioneered the integration of design, manufacturing, and global distribution as well as branding in Cebu, operating from his headquarters on the island.

Awards to his credit include Hong Kong's Design for Asia Award, the Japan Good Design Award, the American Society of Interior Designers Selection, the French Coup de Coeur Award, and the first Asian Designer of the Year title given by the Maison et Objet in Paris.

Cobonpue designs have appeared in full-length films such as Ocean's 13 and CSI Miami while his roster of clientele includes Hollywood celebrities and members of royalty like Queen Sofía of Spain, Queen Rania of Jordan, and former couple Angelina Jolie and Brad Pitt. TIME Magazine has called him “rattan’s first great virtuoso."

Career

Interior Crafts of the Islands, Inc. (I.C.I) 
After a series of further studies and apprentices abroad, Kenneth moved back to Cebu in 1996 to help manage their family business founded by his mother in 1972. Upon managing the business, Kenneth discovered that by the use of natural fibers and materials as a medium, modern design could have a new face.

NEDA Region 7 chair
In March 2017, Cobonpue was appointed by President Rodrigo Duterte as chairperson of the National Economic and Development Authority Regional Development Council for Central Visayas.

Timeline of collections 

1980 – Lotus (patented)
1998 – Yin Yang – Cobonpue's first design.
1999 – Balou
2000 – Pigalle, La Luna
2001 – Voyage
2002 – Yoda, Croissant, Kabuki, Lulu
2003 – Tilt, Matilda, Amaya, Dimple, Lolita, Terra
2004 – Chiquita, Lolah, Wave, Pirouette
2005 – Stitches, Retaso, Suzy Wong, Kawayan
2006 – Dragnet, Dimsum, Link
2007 – Kawayan Too, Manolo
2008 – Oasis, Noodle, Bouquet, Operetta
2009 – Bloom, Harry, Hagia, Freya, Nobu, Vaña
2010 – Rapunzel, Ima, Juniper, Ziggy
2011 – Cabaret, Papillion, Mermaid,Dream Catcher, Pebble, Giza, Enoki, Tria
2012 – Eclipse, Tropez, Zaza, Kaja, Parchment Table, Annika
2013 – Parchment, Calyx, Adesso, Trame, Papillion Swing
2018 – Star Wars Collection – in collaboration with the Disney Company Philippines

Other appearances  
International Design Yearbook 2005 (Lawrence King Publishing House of London) curated by Marcel Wanders 
International Design Yearbook 2004 (Lawrence King Publishing House of London) curated by Tom Dixon 
International Design Yearbook 2002 (Lawrence King Publishing House of London) curated by Ross Lovegrove.
Tropical Living and Tropical Interiors both by Elizabeth Reyes (Periplus Editions) 2002
New Bedroom Design, 2004 (Daab GmbH) by Marcel Wanders 2005
1000 New Designs and Where to Find Them, 2006 (Laurence King Publishing, Ltd.)by Jennifer Hudson 
Tropical Interiors, 2002, (Periplus Editions HK) by Elizabeth Reyes. Pages 93–97
Design Now!, 2007 (Taschen GmbH) by Charlotte & Peter Fiell 
Simply Material, 2007, (Viction:Workshop Limited) by Victor Cheung
Fork, 2007 (Phaidon Press)  by Tom Dixon
Phaidon's new 2007 book, "& FORK," underscores his leading position in the industry.
Appearance in European television including Deutsche Welle and Dutch TV
“The Voyager” – “Never gonna leave this Bed” music video by Maroon 5  | January 29, 2011
International magazines: 
Wallpaper
Newsweek 
TIME Magazine July 2006 ISSN 0040-781X
Newspapers: The Washington Post and Shanghai Daily News
“Ocean’s Thirteen”
“CSI: Miami”

Other Media Magazines featuring Kenneth Cobonpue

References

Travel+Leisure Magazine (October 2009)

External links

Living people
Filipino designers
People from Cebu City
1968 births
Duterte administration personnel